This is a list of medalists at the IBA World Boxing Championships.

Minimumweight
 −48 kg: 2021–

Light flyweight
 −48 kg: 1974–2009
 −49 kg: 2011–2017

Flyweight
 −51 kg: 1974–2009
 −52 kg: 2011–2019
 −51 kg: 2021–

Bantamweight
 −54 kg: 1974–2009
 −56 kg: 2011–2017
 −54 kg: 2021–

Featherweight
 −57 kg: 1974–2009, 2019–

Lightweight
 −60 kg: 1974–2017, 2021–

Light welterweight
 −63.5 kg: 1974–2001
 −64 kg: 2003–2017
 −63 kg: 2019
 −63.5 kg: 2021–

Welterweight
 −67 kg: 1974–2001
 −69 kg: 2003–2019
 −67 kg: 2021–

Light middleweight
 −71 kg: 1974–2001, 2021–

Middleweight
 −75 kg: 1974–

Light heavyweight
 −81 kg: 1974–2019
 −80 kg: 2021–

Cruiserweight
 –86 kg: 2021–

Heavyweight
 +81 kg: 1974–1978
 −91 kg: 1982–2019
 −92 kg: 2021–

Super heavyweight
 +91 kg: 1982–2019
 +92 kg: 2021–

Doping violations

Multiple gold medalists
Boldface denotes active amateur boxers and highest medal count among all boxers (including these who not included in these tables) per type.

References
AIBA

World Amateur Championship medalists
medalists